Champorcher is a comune in the Aosta Valley region of northwestern Italy, the main town in the Champorcher Valley.

References

External links
 Champorcher, lovevda.it
 Scuola di Sci Champorcher, lovevda.it

Cities and towns in Aosta Valley